Kenneth Douglas Ross (27 August 1927 – 19 September 2004) was an Australian rules footballer who played for Fitzroy in the Victorian Football League (VFL).

Ross was a versatile footballer, used often as a ruck-rover, whom Fitzroy recruited from VFA club Northcote. He spent eight seasons at Fitzroy, before returning to the VFA in 1956 where he was signed by Camberwell as playing coach. In 1957 he won the J. J. Liston Trophy and two years later made a comeback with Fitzroy. He appeared in all 18 games that the club played in the 1959 VFL season but retired after two games early the following year.

References

Holmesby, Russell and Main, Jim (2007). The Encyclopedia of AFL Footballers. 7th ed. Melbourne: Bas Publishing.

1927 births
Fitzroy Football Club players
Camberwell Football Club players
Camberwell Football Club coaches
Northcote Football Club players
J. J. Liston Trophy winners
Australian rules footballers from Victoria (Australia)
2004 deaths